Józef Gut Misiaga (born 25 May 1939) is a Polish cross-country skier. He competed at the 1960 Winter Olympics and the 1964 Winter Olympics.

References

1939 births
Living people
Polish male cross-country skiers
Olympic cross-country skiers of Poland
Cross-country skiers at the 1960 Winter Olympics
Cross-country skiers at the 1964 Winter Olympics
Sportspeople from Zakopane